This is a list of the European Music & Media magazine's European Hot 100 Singles and European Top 100 Albums number-ones of 1992.

See also
1992 in music
List of number-one hits in Europe

1992 record charts
Lists of number-one albums in Europe
Lists of number-one songs in Europe